Kaplin may refer to:

 Kaplin, Masovian Voivodeship, a village in Poland
 Kaplin, Greater Poland Voivodeship, a village in Poland

See also
 Kaplon (disambiguation)
 Kapton, a polyimide film